RannaBelagali  is a Pattan Panchayat Town in the southern state of Karnataka, India. It is located in the Mudhol taluka of Bagalkot district  in Karnataka

Demographics
 India census, RannaBelagali had a population of 15,041, with 7,582 males and 7,459 females.

In the 2011 census, the population of RannaBelagali was reported as 17,175.

See also
 Districts of Karnataka

References

External links
 

Villages in Bagalkot district
Western Chalukya Empire
Chalukya dynasty